Thomas Sisson (19 October 1894 – 1976) was an English professional footballer. He briefly played for Notts County before the First World War and went on to play for Gillingham and Lincoln City between 1919 and 1926.

References

1894 births
1976 deaths
English footballers
Gillingham F.C. players
Notts County F.C. players
Lincoln City F.C. players
Association footballers not categorized by position